Steinar Birgisson (born 25 May 1955) is an Icelandic former handball player who competed in the 1984 Summer Olympics.

References

1955 births
Living people
Steinar Birgisson
Steinar Birgisson
Handball players at the 1984 Summer Olympics